Josef Mik, also Joseph Mik (23 March 1839 in Zábřeh – 13 October 1900 in Vienna) was a Bohemian entomologist mainly interested in Diptera. He described many new species and made contributions to knowledge of the Diptera of Central Europe. Mik was the first dipterist to clarify the chaetotaxy of the legs.
" On the legs I distinguish a front [chaeta]- and a hind-side ; an upper- and an under-side. When we imagine the leg stretched out horizontally and perpendicularly to the longitudinal axis of the body, the front-side is that which is turned towards the head, and the hind-sidethat turned towards the end of the body ; the upper- and under-side, in such a case, are self-understood."<ref>'Mik, J. 1878 Dipterologische Untersuchungen Jahresber K.K. Akad. Gymnasium Vienna</ref>

Mik was born in Zábřeh, Moravia. From 1871 to 1889 he was teacher at the Academic Gymnasium in Vienna. In 1889 he was given the Knight's Cross of the Order of Franz Joseph; he died in Vienna.

 Works 
 1866 Beitrag zur Dipterenfauna des österreichischen Küstenlandes. Abh. Zool.-Bot. Ges. Wien 16:301-310. 
 1883 Dipterologische Bemerkungen I, II. Abh. Zool.-Bot. Ges. Wien 33: 181-192. 
 1886 Dipterologische Miscellen, II, III, Wien. Ent. Ztg. 5: 276-279, 317-318
 1887 Dipterologische Miscellen. VI. Wien. Ent. Ztg. 6: 238-242. 
 1891 Ueber die Dipterengattung Pachystylum Mcq. Wien. Ent. Ztg. 10: 206-212. 
 1891 Vorläufige Notiz über Parathalassius blasigii, ein neues Dipteron aus Venedig. Wien. Ent.Ztg. 10: 216-217.
 1894 Dipterologische Miscellen (2. Serie). IV. Wien. Ent. Ztg. 13:49-54.
 1895 Dipterologische Miscellen (2. Series). VI. Wien. Ent. Ztg. 14:93-98. 
 1895 With Friedrich (Fritz) Wachtl Commentar zu den Arbeiten von Hartig und Ratzeburg über Raupenfliegen (Tachiniden).Auf Grund einer Revision der Hartig’schen Tachiniden-Sammlung. Wien. Ent. Ztg. 14:213-48.

Mik also made contributions to the field of botany.

 References 

 Freiherr Osten-Sacken, C. R. 1903: Record of my life and work in entomology. - Cambridge (Mass.)
 Riedl, H. 1975: Mik, Josef'', in: Österreichisches Biographisches Lexikon VI. - Wien

19th-century Czech people
Czech entomologists
Dipterists
Czech expatriates in Austria
People from Zábřeh
1839 births
1900 deaths